Vedala Hemachandra is a Telugu independent artist, playback singer, and music director who works in the Telugu film industry.

Personal life
Hemachandra is born on June 2, 1988. Hemachandra's mother Sasikala Swamy Vedala is a singer and music teacher, father Swamy Vedala is an advocate. Hemachandra has a sister Himabindu, she is a playback singer and music teacher.Hemachandra married singer Sravana Bhargavi on 14 February 2013. They have a daughter named Shikhara Chandrika, who was born on 2 July 2016. Hemachandra started his own YouTube channel in the year 2017. Hemachandra composes independent music as Hemachandra originals for his own YouTube channel. He sung the jingle "Hook Aipodam" along with Sahithi Chaganti, in September 2021, for Red FM 93.5.  It was part of radio's effort to reflects the style and culture of the two Telugu states - Andhra Pradesh and Telangana.

Hemachandra studied at All Saints High School, Hyderabad.

Discography

As an independent artist

As playback singer

As music director

Filmography

As dubbing artist

References

External links

Telugu playback singers
Indian male playback singers
1988 births
Living people
Singers from Hyderabad, India
Indian male voice actors
Alumni of All Saints High School, Hyderabad